The 1982 England rugby union tour of Canada and the United States was a series of eight matches played by the England national rugby union team in Canada and the United States in May and June 1982. The tour was entirely successful as the England team won all its eight matches and conceded only 34 points. England did not award full international caps for the internationals against Canada and the United States.

Matches 
Scores and results list England's points tally first.

Touring party
Manager: Budge Rogers
Assistant Manager: Mike Davis
Captain: Steve Smith

Full back
Dusty Hare (Leicester)
Nick Stringer (Wasps)

Three-quarters
John Carleton (Orrell)
Clive Woodward (Leicester)
Tony Bond (Sale)
Tony Swift (Swansea)
Neil McDowell (Gosforth)
Steve Holdstock (Nottingham)

Half-backs
Les Cusworth (Leicester)
Peter Williams (Orrell)
Steve Smith (Sale)
Nigel Melville (Wakefield)

Forwards
John Scott (Cardiff)
Peter Winterbottom (Headingley)
David Cooke Harlequins
John Gadd (Gloucester)
Nick Jeavons (Moseley)
Maurice Colclough (Angoulême)
Jim Syddall (Waterloo)
Steve Bainbridge (Gosforth)
Gary Pearce (Northampton)
Phil Blakeway (Gloucester)
Paul Rendall (Wasps)
Malcolm Preedy (Gloucester)
Peter Wheeler (Leicester)
Steve Mills (Gloucester)

Notes

References

England rugby union tour
England national rugby union team tours
Rugby union tours of Canada
Rugby union tours of the United States
Rugby union in Connecticut
tour
1982 in Canadian rugby union
England tour